Prospect Park station may refer to:

 Prospect Park station (Metro Transit), a station on the METRO Green Line, Minneapolis-St. Paul, Minnesota
 Prospect Park station (BMT lines), a station on the BMT Brighton and Fulton Street Lines of the New York City Subway
 Prospect Park station (SEPTA), a station on the SEPTA Wilmington/Newark Line, Philadelphia, Pennsylvania

See also
 15th Street–Prospect Park station, a station on the IND Culver Line of the New York City Subway